was a Japanese nobleman, bureaucrat, and chronicler.

He is most famous for compiling and editing, with the assistance of Hieda no Are, the Kojiki, the oldest extant Japanese history. Empress Genmei (r. 707-721) charged Yasumaro with the duty of writing the Kojiki in 711 using the differing clan chronicles and native myths. It was finished the following year and presented to Empress Genmei in 3 volumes in 712.

Career Details 
In 704, Yasumaro was promoted from Shorokuinoge (Senior Sixth Rank, Lower Grade) to the rank of Jugoinoge (Junior Fifth Rank, Lower Grade).

In 711, Yasumaro was promoted to Shogoinojo (Senior Fifth Rank, Upper Grade). In September of the same year, Emperor Genmei presumably ordered him to combine two pre-existing documents, the "Imperial Sun-lineage" and "Ancient Dicta of Former Ages", which was learned and recited by Hieda no Are, in order to create a historical compilation by following genealogical documents of the imperial line. This historical compilation was called the Kojiki, and it was completed in the following year in 712. At the end of the Yuan-ing Dynasty, in 715, Yasumaro was promoted to Jushiinoge (Junior Fourth Rank, Lower Grade).

In 716, Yasumaro became the head of the Ō shi (多氏) clan . During this period, Yasumaro most likely also played an active role in compiling the Nihon Shoki, which was finished in 720. He died on July 6, 723 at the end of the Genjo Dynasty. His final official rank was Minbukyo Jushiinoge (Junior Fourth Rank, Lower Grade).

In 1911, he was posthumously promoted to Jusanmi (Junior Third Rank).

Ō no Yasumaro Epitaph

On January 20, 1979, the grave of Ō no Yasumaro was unearthed in a tea plantation in Konose Ward of Nara City. Its engraving reads:

In fiction

Yasumaro appears in the video game Toukiden: The Age of Demons as a mitama (a soul of a hero from Japanese history).

Yasumaro appears in the video game Sid Meier's Civilization VI as a Great Prophet.

Notes

References
 
 
 

People of Nara-period Japan
723 deaths
Year of birth unknown
Deified Japanese people